Oppenheim Collins was a major women's specialty clothing store, headquartered in New York City, New York.

History

Founding
Oppenheim Collins & Company, Inc. was founded by Albert D. Oppenheim and Charles J. Oppenheim, and was later joined by Isaac D. Levy.  Their first store was opened in 1901 in downtown New York City.

Branch stores
In 1905, a branch store opened at 534 Main Street, in Buffalo, New York.  The store expanded to include the Miss Vincent's Tea Room and was remodeled in 1935 and in 1951.

Despite its size, Oppenheim, Collins clarified that it was not a department store, but a women’s specialty store.

In 1956, a suburban Buffalo location opened at Thruway Plaza in Cheektowaga, New York.  The "Top of the Town" restaurant operated out of the Downtown Buffalo store.  The Buffalo area stores closed in 1979, along with others in the Franklin Simon & Co. chain with the bankruptcy of City Stores. Later expansion in the 1950s, led to the first store outside of New York. In 1958, Oppenheim Collins opened a location in the new Harundale Mall in Glen Burnie, Maryland.

Unionization
In 1944, Local 1250 of the Retail, Wholesale and Department Store Union, CIO won a new contract with Oppenheim Collins that included a closed shop, a $2.00 pay increase, and elimination of "free" overtime work during peak sales and inventory periods.

In 1948, Oppenheim Collins employees, represented by Local 1250 of the Retail, Wholesale and Department Store Union, CIO, struck against the company.

City stores
A majority interest in Oppenheim Collins was purchased by City Stores Company in 1945.  In the 1950s, the store was merged with Franklin Simon & Co. although the two stores operated under their original trade names until the Oppenheim Collins stores were finally renamed Franklin Simon & Co. in 1961/1962.

Presidents
Isaac D. Levy, - 1934
James C. Bolger, 1934 - 
Robert D. Levy, - 1941
Otto L. Kinz, 1941 - 1945
Philip N. Cohan, 1947 - 1949
Gordon K. Greenfield, 1949 -

References

Defunct department stores based in New York City